Nadia Saphira Ganie (born October 20, 1987) is an Indonesian actress, model and lawyer. Her first major role was in the TV series version of Ada Apa dengan Cinta? (2003–2005) on RCTI. Her film career includes the romantic comedy Jomblo (2006), followed by Coklat Stroberi (2007), Cintapuccino and Under the Tree (2008). She appeared in various Indonesian TV series, such as Impian Cinderella (2006), Rahasia Pelangi  (2011) and a serial of Jomblo  (2007).

Early life
Nadia was born in Jakarta, the daughter of Junaedy Ganie, a business executive and insurance specialist, who served as the CEO of BNI Life. Nadia graduated from public school SMA Negeri 70 Bulungan, Jakarta and received her bachelor's degree of law from Pelita Harapan University. Then she earned her master's degree from the University of Westminster, London in 2013.

Career
She was one of the finalists of GADIS SAMPUL 2003.
After graduating from the University of Westminster, she returned to Indonesia to pursue a career in law. She started with O.C. Kaligis and Lucas S.H. & Partners. She later opened her own law firm, Bayuputra Hutasoit Ganie.

Filmography

Film

Television

References

1987 births
Living people
People from Jakarta
Indonesian female models
Indonesian film actresses
Indonesian television actresses
Indonesian socialites
Indonesian Muslims
Alumni of the University of Westminster